DKM or dkm may refer to:

Daniel Keys Moran (born 1962), US  programmer and  writer
 D'Kings Men, a 2013 Nigerian compilation album
 Dropkick Murphys, an American Celtic punk band
 Dyson Kissner-Moran, US investment firm involved in DKM Broadcasting (WDBZ)
 An unofficial ship prefix for Deutsche Kriegsmarine
 Downloadable kernel module, a loadable kernel module in VxWorks
 Abbreviation of German , used in the name of Wankel engines

See also